Michael Charles Fellows (December 8, 1957 – September 19, 2016) was an American political activist and Army reservist. He was also a state coordinator for the Montana Fully Informed Jury Association.<ref>Missoulian', October 1, 2014 U.S. House candidate Fellows seeks to balance budget, cut debt, protect gun rights By Charles S. Johnson</ref> In the 1990s he issued a press release calling for the impeachment of Bill Clinton.  Fellows made political history in 2012 by becoming the first Libertarian candidate ever to gather more than 40% of the vote in a partisan statewide race.

Political
Fellows was the state chair of the Montana Libertarian Party. He had an involvement with the party that went back to 1988.
In 1998 he was in the race for Montana's lone U.S. house seat with Democrat Robert "Dusty" Deschamps, Reform Party candidate Webb Sullivan and Republican freshman Rick Hill with Hill ending up the winner.Roundup Record Trubune & Winnett Times, November 11, 1998 Republicans Win In County General Election Results
In 2006 he was in the race, running against Republican Denny Rehberg and Democrat Monica Lindeen.

In 2012, he secured a place for himself in political history by becoming the first Libertarian Party candidate to achieve passing the 40 percent vote mark in a partisan statewide race. He actually got 43 percent which amounted to 185,419 votes. This  carried 27 of Montana's 56 counties in a two-way race for the Supreme Court clerk.NBC Montana, September 20, 2016 – Local Elections, Libertarian candidate Mike Fellows killed in car crash By: The Associated Press The race was against incumbent Democrat Ed Smith, who narrowly won.

In November 2014 he was in the race for  Montana's U.S. House seat. He ran against Democrat John Lewis and Republican Ryan Zinke. The three reasons he gave for running were to try to protect Second Amendment gun rights, balance the federal budget and reduction of the federal debt. He pulled 10,654 votes but Republican Zinke won.

He was referred to in the  Choteau Acantha by Dylan Chaffin as the real-life political version of the Energizer Bunny. He was also referred to in the Bozeman Daily Chronicle as "Montana's 'godfather of third-party politics'".

Political views and stances

Fellows advocated for the repeal of the 2001 Patriot Act, which was passed by the government in the wake of 9/11. He was critical of the law for violating constitutional provisions, pointing out unreasonable searches and seizures. He was about allowing people to do what they wanted as long as they didn't infringe on the rights of others.

Fellows was opposed to sending more ground troops to the Middle East. He once commented, ... "We're just going to keep at this thing, losing lives and spending money."

On abortion, Fellows stated that while he was personally opposed to it, libertarians do not believe the government should be involved in such matters.

About a bill that would banish third parties from the ballot, Fellows suggested that Republicans didn't believe in free market as they were trying to use the forces of government to their ends.

Other organizations
In addition to the Montana Fully Informed Jury Association, Fellows was a trustee for American Legion Post 27 and on the board of Missoula Community Access Television.

Accident and death
Fellows died at the age of 58 in a car crash near Potomac in Missoula County, Montana, on September 19, 2016, following a campaign event in Seeley Lake. Fellows was involved in a head-on automobile accident on Highway 200. He died at the accident scene. According to an investigation, Fellows had been traveling west while returning from Seeley Lake where he had attended a campaign function. Apparently the Lexus that Fellows was driving had crossed the center line.

References

External links
 Website

1957 births
2016 deaths
People from Lewiston, Idaho
American activists
Montana Libertarians
Montana politicians
Road incident deaths in Montana